Lagh Doss is a lake at San Bernardino in the Val Mesolcina of the Grisons, Switzerland. It is located at an elevation of 1652 m. The site is listed in the Federal Inventory of Raised and Transitional Bogs of National Importance.

Doss
Doss
Protected areas of Switzerland
Rheinwald